Advanced Drainage Systems, Inc. (ADS) designs, manufactures and markets polypropylene and polyethylene pipes, plastic leach field chambers and systems, septic tanks and accessories, storm retention/detention and septic chambers, polyvinyl chloride drainage structures, fittings, and water filters and water separators. It is the largest maker of high-density polyethylene pipe in the United States. It is headquartered in Hilliard, Ohio. In 2020, 93% of the company's sales were in the United States and 6% were in Canada.

History
The company was founded in 1966 by Ron Martin and Marty Sixt, two engineers. In the early 1970s, it moved to central Ohio.

In 2004, Joe Chlapaty became CEO of the company; he retired in 2017 and was succeeded by Scott Barbour.

In July 2014, the company became a public company via an initial public offering on the New York Stock Exchange, raising $232 million.

In February 2015, the company acquired Ideal Pipe of Ontario for $45 million.

In July 2019, the company acquired Infiltrator Water Technologies from the Ontario Teachers' Pension Plan for $1.08 billion.

In 2019, approximately 65% of its pipes were made from recycled materials.

References

External links

2014 initial public offerings
American companies established in 1966
Companies listed on the New York Stock Exchange
Water companies of the United States